The following is a list of notable deaths in December 1993.

Entries for each day are listed alphabetically by surname. A typical entry lists information in the following sequence:
 Name, age, country of citizenship at birth, subsequent country of citizenship (if applicable), reason for notability, cause of death (if known), and reference.

December 1993

1
Lynette Davies, 45, Welsh actress, suicide.
Edwin Flavell, 95, British Army officer.
Ray Gillen, 34, American rock singer-songwriter, AIDS-related complications.
Sir Ivor Hele, 81, Australian artist.
Scott Kolk, 88, American actor.
Mary Lobel, 93, British historian.
Giulio Marchetti, 82, Italian and actor and television presenter, internal hemorrhage.

2
Ali Benfadah, 58, Algerian football player and manager.
Paal Brekke, 70, Norwegian lyricist, novelist, and literary critic.
Evelyn Dearman, 85, English tennis player.
Harry Julius Emeléus, 90, English inorganic chemist.
Pablo Escobar, 44, Colombian drug lord and narcoterrorist, shot.
John Kershaw, 62, British screenwriter and script editor.
Tom Monroe, 74, American actor.
Leo Paquin, 83, American football player.

3
Frank Anthony, 85, Indian politician and Anglo-Indian community leader.
George P. Hammond, 97, American professor of Latin American studies.
Witold Majchrzycki, 84, Polish Olympic boxer.
Lea Mek, 18,  Cambodian-American gang member, murdered in gang shooting.
Steve Paproski, 65, Canadian politician and football player.
Lewis Thomas, 80, American science writer.

4
Victor Gunnarsson, 40, Swedish right-wing activist, homicide.
Marcel Jean, 92, French painter, writer, and sculptor.
Margaret Landon, 90, American writer and missionary.
Hugh Moore, 64, British City of London Police commander, heart failure.
Jusuf Prazina, 31, Bosnian gangster and paramilitary warlord during the Bosnian War, homicide.
Frank Sturgis, 68, American CIA operative and one of the Watergate burglars, lung cancer.
Roy Vernon, 56, Welsh football player.
Frank Zappa, 52, American musician, singer-songwriter and record producer, prostate cancer.

5
Mike Dowdle, 55, American gridiron football player.
Yevgeny Gabrilovich, 94, Soviet and Russian writer, playwright and screenwriter.
Doug Hopkins, 32, American musician and songwriter, suicide by gunshot.
Rita Macedo, 68, Mexican actress and dressmaker, suicide by gunshot.
Vince Mazza, 68, Canadian football player.
Robert Ochsenfeld, 92, German physicist.
Alexandre Trauner, 87, Hungarian film production designer.

6
Don Ameche, 85, American actor (Cocoon, Trading Places, Heaven Can Wait), Oscar winner (1986), prostate cancer.
Bryson Graham, 41, English rock drummer.
Anna Hřebřinová, 85, Czechoslovak gymnast and Olympian.
Hendrik Ooms, 77, Dutch cyclist.
Paul-Louis Weiller, 100, French industrialist and philanthropist.

7
Nicky Crane, 35, English neo-Nazi activist, AIDS-related bronchopneumonia.
Abidin Dino, 80, Turkish artist and painter, cancer.
Félix Houphouët-Boigny, 88, President of Ivory Coast, cancer.
Blaže Koneski, 71, Macedonian poet, writer, and linguistic scholar.
Wolfgang Paul, 80, German physicist and Nobel Prize laureate.
Robert Taft, Jr., 76, American politician.

8
Carl Damm, 66, German politician and member of the Bundestag.
Yevgeny Minayev, 60, Russian weightlifter, starvation and hypothermia.
Carlotta Monti, 86, American film actress.
Cole Palen, 67, American aviator.
Philippe Pradayrol, 27, French judoka, traffic collision.
Mieczysław Wilczewski, 61, Polish cyclist.

9
Salvatore Allegra, 95, Italian composer.
Danny Blanchflower, 67, Northern Irish football player, Alzheimer's disease.
Mohammad-Reza Golpaygani, 94, Iranian Grand Ayatollah and Shia islam scholar.
Herbert Grevenius, 92, Swedish screenwriter.
Matt Guokas, 78, American basketball player and broadcaster.
Carter Jefferson, 48, American jazz tenor saxophonist.
Alexander Koblencs, 77, Latvian chess master and writer.
John Wisdom, 89, British philosopher.

10
Maroun Bagdadi, 43, Lebanese film director, fall.
Jerzy Juskowiak, 54, Polish sprinter and Olympian.
Fernand Mithouard, 84, French cyclist.
Alice Tully, 91, American opera singer, music promoter, and philanthropist, influenza.
Miljan Zeković, 68, Montenegrin and Yugoslav football player and manager.
Alan E. Zimmer, 64, American neuroradiologist, stroke.

11
Ku Cheng-kang, 91, Chinese politician and scholar.
Francisco Flores del Campo, 86, Chilean composer, instrumentalist and actor, cardiovascular disease.
Raymond D. Gary, 85, American businessman and politician.
Bohdan Likszo, 53, Polish basketball player.
Paul Mebus, 73, German football player.
Bill Mumm, 71, New Zealand rugby union player and politician.
Steve Nelson, 90, Croatian-American political activist.
Karl-Theodor Molinari, 78, German Army and Bundeswehr officer and politician.
Pierre Sarr N'Jie, 84, Gambian lawyer and politician.
Phil Perlo, 58, American gridiron football player.
Elvira Popescu, 99, Romanian-French actress and theatre director.
Sam Stayman, 84, American bridge player and writer.

12
József Antall, 61, Hungarian teacher, librarian, historian, and statesman, cancer.
Ned Barry, 88, New Zealand rugby union player and police officer.
Marian Constance Blackton, 92, American screenwriter and actress.
Fritz Bock, 82, Austrian politician.
Joan Cross, 93, English soprano.
Alexandru Drăghici, 80, Romanian communist activist and politician.
Don Earle, 64, American ice hockey announcer.
Bob Taylor, 89, American ice hockey player.

13
Ken Anderson, 84, American art director (Snow White and the Seven Dwarfs, The Sword in the Stone) and screenwriter (Cinderella), stroke.
Larry Cameron, 41, American gridiron football player and professional wrestler, heart attack in ring during match.
Vanessa Duriès, 21, French novelist, traffic collision.
Joy Laurey (pen name of Jean-Pierre Imbrohoris), 50, French novelist, traffic collision.
Tommy Sexton, 36, Canadian comedian, AIDS-related complications.
Billy Shantz, 66, American baseball player and manager.
Gaziza Zhubanova, 66, Kazakh composer.

14
Jeff Alm, 25, American gridiron football player, suicide.
Shirley J. Dreiss, 44, American hydrologist and hydrogeologist, traffic collision.
Frank Fuller, 64, American gridiron football player.
Jennifer Howard, 68, American actress, lung cancer.
Francis Jones, 85, Welsh historian and officer of arms.
Aristides Azevedo Pacheco Leão, 79, Brazilian neurophysiologist and researcher, respiratory failure.
Myrna Loy, 88, American actress (The Thin Man, The Best Years of Our Lives, Cheaper by the Dozen), lung cancer.
Silvina Ocampo, 90, Argentine short story writer, poet, and artist.

15
Tom Bedecki, 64, Canadian ice hockey player and coach.
Raúl Esnal, 37, Uruguayan football player, homicide.
Penaia Ganilau, 75, First President of Fiji, leukemia.
William Dale Phillips, 68, American physical chemist and academic.
Marcel Vandernotte, 84, French rower and Olympian.

16
Charizma, 20, American MC, shot.
Fedele Gentile, 85, Italian film actor.
Moses Gunn, 64, American actor (Shaft, Little House on the Prairie, Heartbreak Ridge), asthma.
Riley Hill, 79, American actor.
Jed Johnson, Jr., 53, American politician.
Charles Moore, 68, American architect and writer.
Kakuei Tanaka, 75, Japanese politician, pneumonia.

17
Patrick Crowley, 87, Irish politician and trade union official.
Bobby Davidson, 65, Scottish football referee.
Hilding Hagberg, 94, Swedish communist politician.
Mirza Ibrahimov, 82, Soviet and Azerbaijani writer, playwright, and public figure.
Len Julians, 60, English football player.
Janet Margolin, 50, American actress, ovarian cancer.

18
Bernard Ayandho, 63, Central African politician and diplomat.
Joseph H. Ball, 88, American journalist and politician.
Georges Bégué, 82, French engineer and SOE agent during World War II.
Marion Barbara "Joe" Carstairs, 93, British-American powerboat racer.
Gheorghe Cozorici, 60, Romanian actor.
Helm Glöckler, 84, German amateur racing driver.
Steve James, 41, American actor and stunt performer, cancer.
Tony Kappen, 74, American basketball player.
Buster Larsen, 73, Danish actor.
Natalya Sats, 90, Russian stage director.
Bernhard Sälzer, 53, German politician and member of the European Parliament, traffic collision.
Sam Wanamaker, 74, American actor and director, prostate cancer.

19
Wallace F. Bennett, 95, American businessman and politician.
Michael Clarke, 47, American drummer (The Byrds), liver failure.
Iichirō Hatoyama, 75, Japanese politician.
Inez James, 74, American film score composer.
Owain Owain, 64, Welsh novelist, short-story writer and poet.
Hans Rohrbach, 90, German mathematician and cryptanalyst during World War II.

20
Gussie Nell Davis, 87, American educator and founder of the Kilgore College Rangerettes.
Hubert Deltour, 82, Belgian racing cyclist.
W. Edwards Deming, 93, American engineer, statistician, author, and lecturer.
Nazife Güran, 72, Turkish composer.
Charles Herman Helmsing, 85, American prelate of the Roman Catholic Church.
Hulusi Kentmen, 81, Turkish actor, kidney failure.
Felix Mackiewicz, 76, American baseball player.

21
Sir Philip Christison, 4th Baronet, 100, British Army officer.
Guy des Cars, 82, French novelist.
Frederick J. Harlfinger II, 80, American Navy officer.
Ivan Kozlovskyi, 93, Soviet and Russian lyric tenor.
Zack Mosley, 87, American comic strip artist.
Pekka Niemi, 84, Finnish cross-country skier and Olympian.
Margarita Nikolaeva, 58, Soviet gymnast and Olympian.

22
Mario Amendola, 83, Italian screenwriter, film director and dramatist, diabetes.
Sylvia Bataille, 85, French actress, heart attack.
Oto Bihalji-Merin, 89, Yugoslav and Serbian writer, painter and art critic.
Marion Burns, 86, American film actress.
Don DeFore, 80, American actor, heart attack.
Alexander Mackendrick, 81, American-Scottish film director, pneumonia.
Salah Zulfikar, 67, Egyptian actor and film producer.

23
Sveinbjörn Beinteinsson, 69, Icelandic religious leader and neopaganist, heart attack.
Gertrude Blom, 92, Swiss journalist, social anthropologist, and documentary photographer.
Lauchlin Currie, 91, American economist.
James Ellison, 83, American film actor, fall.
Luigi Giuliano, 63, Italian football player.
Jean Maréchal, 83, French racing cyclist.
Chucho Navarro, 80, Mexican singer.
Marcello Neri, 91, Italian Olympic cyclist.

24
Pierre Victor Auger, 94, French physicist.
Yen Chia-kan, 88, President of the Republic of China.
Anita Dorris, 90, German actress of the silent era.
Ralph Downes, 89, English organist, organ designer, and music director.
Ivano Fontana, 67, Italian boxer.
Andrzej Nadolski, 72, Polish historian, archaeologist, and professor.
Dorothea Parker, 65, New Zealand sprinter, cancer.
Norman Vincent Peale, 95, American writer and minister, stroke.
J. Wayne Reitz, 84, American agricultural economist and university president.
Vladimir Šimunić, 74, Croatian football player and manager.

25
Blandine Ebinger, 94, German cabaret singer and actress.
Princess Marie Adelheid of Lippe-Biesterfeld, 98, German princess, socialite, and author.
Ama Naidoo, 85, South African anti-apartheid activist, heart failure.
Jeff Phillips, 30, American professional skateboarder, suicide by gunshot.
Ann Ronell, 86, American composer and lyricist.
Azat Sherents, 80, Soviet and Armenian actor.
Marian Suski, 88, Polish fencer and Olympian.
Nikolai Timkov, 81, Soviet and Russian painter.

26
Dave Beck, 99, American labor leader.
Lilian Edirisinghe, 71, Sri Lankan actress.
Jeff Morrow, 86, American actor.
Carlos Muñoz, 29, Ecuadorian football player, traffic collision.
Patrick W. Ryan, 1992, Irish politician.

27
Michael Callen, 38, American musician, author, and AIDS activist, AIDS-related complications.
Feliks Kibbermann, 91, Estonian chess master and philologist.
Nina Lugovskaya, 75, Soviet painter and theatre designer.
Evald Mikson, 82, Estonian football player.
André Pilette, 75, Belgian racecar driver.
Paavo Susitaival, 97, Finnish politician and military officer.

28
William Austin, 90, Canadian-American film editor.
Alfonso Balcázar, 67, Spanish screenwriter, film director and producer.
Howard Caine, 67, American actor (Hogan's Heroes, 1776, Judgment at Nuremberg''), heart attack.
Augie Galan, 81, American baseball player, manager and coach.
John Kemp, 53, New Zealand footballer and cricketer.
Jennifer Lash, 55, English novelist and painter, breast cancer.
William L. Shirer, 89, American journalist and war correspondent.

29
Axel Corti, 60, Austrian screenwriter, film director and radio host.
Yvonne Desportes, 86, French composer, writer, and music educator.
Karl Endres, 82, German basketball player.
Lohengrin Filipello, 75, Swiss television presenter.
Marie Kean, 75, Irish actress.
Marshall Meyer, 63, American conservative rabbi, cancer.
Frunzik Mkrtchyan, 63, Armenian stage and film actor, cancer.

30
Mack David, 81, American lyricist and songwriter.
Dick Donald, 82, Scottish football player and administrator.
Rita Klímová, 62, Czech economist and politician, leukemia.
Irving Paul Lazar, 86, American talent agent and businessman.
Giuseppe Occhialini, 86, Italian physicist.
George Stone, 47, American basketball player, heart attack.
İhsan Sabri Çağlayangil, 85, Turkish politician.

31
Henry A. Byroade, 80, American diplomat.
Bill Cowley, 81, Canadian ice hockey player.
Arthur Dreifuss, 85, German-American film director.
Mikhail Dudin, 77, Soviet and Russian poet and writer.
Zviad Gamsakhurdia, 54, Soviet and Georgian politician, dissident, and writer, shot.
Alexander Girard, 86, American architect and designer.
Bob Johnson, 73, American actor.
Eric "Bingy Bunny" Lamont, 38, Jamaican guitarist and singer, prostate cancer.
Guy Lefrant, 70, French equestrian and Olympian.
Betty McDowall, 69, Australian actress.
Lauriston Sharp, 86, American anthropologist and academic.
Samuel Steward, 84, American writer, professor, tattoo artist and pornographer.
Brandon Teena, 21, American trans man and murder victim, shot.
Thomas Watson, 79, American businessman, politician, and philanthropist, stroke.

References 

1993-12
 12